mainzed ([maɪ̯nt͡sed]; acronym for Mainz  Centre for Digitality in the Humanities and Cultural Studies) is a joint initiative of six scientific institutions to promote digital methodology in the humanities and cultural sciences in Mainz, Germany. It was founded in the context of the academic annual celebration of the Academy of Sciences and Literature Mainz on 6 November 2015. Partners of mainzed are the Academy of Sciences and Literature Mainz (ADW), the Mainz University of Applied Sciences (HS Mainz), the Institute for Historical Regional Studies at the University of Mainz (IGL), the Johannes Gutenberg University Mainz (JGU), the Leibniz Institute of European History Mainz (IEG) and the Romano-Germanic Central Museum Mainz – Archaeological research institute (RGZM).

History 

mainzed is based on several long-term cooperations between larger institutions in Mainz including the six partners from the founding phase. The collaborations already began in 1997 between the Institute for Spatial Information and Surveying Technology (i3mainz) and the RGZM by operating the Competence Centre for Spatial Information Technology in the Humanities. This center is hosted at the HS Mainz together with the i3mainz. The Digitale Akademie was founded in 2009 as research and development institution for digital humanities of the ADW. It is connected to the Institute of Historical Regional Studies at the University of Mainz, the Leibniz Institute of European History and the universities of Mainz. In autumn 2013, the informal Network DHMainz was created with the help of the Mainz Research Alliance. The network prepared the Digital Humanities Day 2014 in Mainz where first drafts for the continuation of the initiative were made, which lead to the founding of the mainzed in 2015.

Tasks 
mainzed was founded in order to accompany and practically implement the transformation of the humanities and cultural studies in the course of digitisation in Mainz.
mainzed works in research, the support of research, qualification and transfer. Furthermore, it constitutes a social research infrastructure by offering a network of scientific exchange with regard to the development of projects and research foci for scientists of all qualification levels.

Range of competences represented in the network:

 3D data
 Art history
 Computer science
 Content management
 Digital archaeology
 Digital Scholarly Editions
 Digital history
 Geographic information system
 Grammatical Variation
 Historical geographic information system
 Musicology, music informatics
 Natural-language processing
 Prosopographical network
 Open data, linked data
 Religious studies
 Semantic modeling, Semantic Web
 TUSTEP / TUSCRIPT
 Web development

mainzed developed the inter-university master’s degree program Digital Methods in the Humanities and Cultural Studies in terms of organization and concept. Since 2016, each winter term 24 students have been able to begin the course of studies comprising four semesters provided that they have a bachelor's degree in the humanities, cultural studies or with a focus in computer science. The head of this degree program and director of mainzed Kai-Christian Bruhn received the academy price of the federal state Rhineland-Palatinate on 5 December 2017 in recognition of his interdisciplinary work in teaching and research.

mainzed is initiator of many events promoting the dialogue with the public. An example of this is the fishbowl discussion about the topic digitalität und diversität – die Geisteswissenschaften im Jahr 2026 that took place in 2016. Mainzed has organised similar annual events with national and international guest lecturers like Mercedes Bunz and Joscha Bach.

Organizational structure 
mainzed is organized into an executive board composed of the founding director Kai-Christian Bruhn as well as his deputy Klaus Pietschmann, a scientific advisory board with representatives of the partner institutions and an executive office.

References

External links 

 mainzed Homepage
 mainzed community page hosted by Zenodo

Digital humanities
Mainz
Cultural studies
Johannes Gutenberg University Mainz
2015 establishments
University of Applied Sciences, Mainz